Maurice Henri Louis Fernand Jacquet (18 March 1886 – 29 June 1954) was a 20th-century French composer and conductor. He died on June 29th, 1954 in New York.

Biography
The son of Alfred Eugene Gustave Jacquet, a photographer, and Jeanne Joséphine Henriette Noël, a singing teacher, H. Maurice Jacquet initially intended to become a virtuoso. He engaged in serious musical study under the direction of Francis Thomé, a composer and pianist. Since he showed serious provisions for musical composition, he followed his earlier training with lessons from Émile Pessard, a professor at the Conservatoire de Paris.

A student of conductor Alexandre Luigini, he regularly directed works by Jules Massenet and Gustave Charpentier.

H. Maurice Jacquet composed art songs, symphonic poems for soloists and orchestra as well as piano works. The creation of Messaouda, a one-act opéra comique written with Davin de Champclos and Andre Mauprey, was incredibly successful and received with great praise when it premiered at the Théâtre Moncey in Paris. Romanitza, a lyrical drama in four acts on a poem by Maurice Magre, was also presented with great success in April 1913 at the Théâtre Municipal of Calais. He also wrote the musicals La Petite Dactylo (1916) and L'As de cœur.''' Both were composed in 1917 but their first performances were held in 1925. For a while, H. Maurice Jacquet was conductor at the Théâtre de l'Odéon, then during the 1920s, he moved to America with his wife, harpist Andrée Amalou-Jacquet. He had also travelled to places including Canada, Cuba (where he directed the National Philharmonic Orchestra for some time), although finally arriving in Broadway in 1929–1930. He composed two musical comedies and film music while living in Hollywood.

In 1926 Maurice, along with Ernö Rapée, Frederick Stahlberg (for a short-time), and Charles Previn, was appointed as music staff at the newly opened Roxy Theatre. In the same year, he took part in the Federation of French Veterans of the Great War Inc, Grand Concert and Annual Ball held at the Hotel Plaza in New York alongside other musician and performers like Lucienne Boyer, Doris Niles, Leon Rothier, M. Van De Putte, and Raymonde Delaunois.

In 1937, he founded the third version of the American Opera Company in Trenton, NJ. It would perform two operatic productions before dissolving.

 Education 
He began his musical training with the Composer and Pianist Francis Thomé, quickly becoming his favorite pupil. After having his ingenious aptitude for composition acknowledged by his parents, he was sent to study with the Composer Mr. Emile Pessard, who was a Professor of Composition at the National Conservatory in Paris. Under his direction, his skills grew rapidly and became known for his individual aesthetic, shaped by but not beholden to influences past and present. He also studied conducting under the French composer and conductor Alexandre Luigini, and through this training, he made collegial friendships with well-known composers like Jules Massenet and M. Gustave Charpentier.

 Marriage 
On April 14, 1904, Maurice Jacquet was married to Rebecca Dusserele (1876-?) in the 18th arrondissement of Paris. However, he divorced her four years later on May 18, 1908. He would then remarry on the 9th of January, 1909 to the singer Helena Anna Marx (1886-1978), daughter of Viktor Marx (1850-?) and Sophie Berthe Brunschwik (1864-1909?) in the 9th arrondissement of Paris. He would remain married for 11 years before divorcing again, this time wedding his final wife, harpist and daughter of famed conductor Auguste Amalou, Andrée Augustine Louise George dit Amalou (1899-?), otherwise known as Andrée Amalou-Jacquet. They would be married in the commune Ézanville in the Seine-et-Oise [now Val-d'Oise] department in Île-de-France.

 Dedications 
Maurice Baron(1889-1964), a 20th-century French-American clarinetist and composer of film scores and "photoplay music" [music to accompany silent films], dedicated his 1928 piano work "Love's Splendor" to Jacquet.  

In 1911, Maurice Jacquet dedicated his melodie "Song of the inconstant" to the French lyric tenor Edmond Clément. 

 Compositions 
 Vocal works 
1908: Messaouda, one-act opéra comique, libretto by Davin de Champclos, music with André de Mauprey 
1908: Sbarra, four-act opéra comique, libretto by Victor Canon and Saint-Aryan
Before 1913: Romanitza, four-act lyrical drama, libretto by Maurice Magre 
1916: Le Poilu, two-act comédie-opérette, libretto by Maurice Hennequin and Pierre Veber
1916: La Petite Dactylo, three-act vaudeville, libretto by Maurice Hennequin and Georges Mitchell 
1919: Aux jardins de Murcie : (suite murcienne) : three-act opera
1920: Son Altesse Papillon, three-act operetta libretto by P. Celval and André Mauprey, music with André Mauprey 
1925: L'As de cœur ou Jim-Jim, three-act operetta, libretto by André Mauprey
1930: The Well of Romance, two-act comedy operetta, libretto by Preston Sturges

Mélodies
 1911: Chanson de l'Inconstant, for piano and voice, poem by Maurice MagreSi je pouvais mourir, for voice and pianoSérénade inutile, for voice and pianoLes enfants, for voice and pianoTes yeux, for voice and pianoLes vieilles de chez nous, for piano and voiceNovembrePatrie air de RysoorA une amie Berceuse amoureuse Invocation à Marie, poem by H. Jacquet (1916)
 Renouveau Toi, poem by H. Jacquet

 Arias 

 Damnation de Faust sérénade, for voice and piano (Piano reduction of the aria "Serenade De Mephistopheles" from H. Berlioz's La damnation de Faust)
 Xerxès, for piano and voice (Translated version of "Ombra Mai Fu" from G. F. Handel's oratorio)

 Artsongs 

 Benvenuto Cellini, for piano and voice

 Symphonic Works 

 Dawn twilight 
 Angelesque 
 Elegie Instrumental 

 Cantique à l'ancienne, for harp
1925: Bouquet de Noëls : airs canadiens, for violin with accompanying piano or organ
1927: The love-waltz Piano Works 

 Nocturnes 
 Air de Ballet 
 Sonnet frivole 
 Danses des Saisons1925: Rhapsodie sur un chant canadien "Alouette"1927: The cuckoo clock Op.1, for piano or harp in olden style

 Film Scores 

 1917: Ils y viennent tous au cinéma, mixture of film and live orchestration at the Nouvel Ambigu Theater
1929: The Holy Terror, Family Comedy
1930: Bear Shooters, Family Comedy
1932: White Zombie, American horror film

 Cantata 

 1927: The mystic trumpeter, for mixed voices and orchestra with children's chorus

 Unfinished 

 Loïs, unfinished, poem by MB de Grancey 

 Literary Works 

 Books 

 1947: The road to successful singingCooke, James Francis. "Volume 66, Number 03 (March 1948)." , (1948). https://digitalcommons.gardner-webb.edu/etude/175

 Recordings 

 Benvenuto Cellini, for piano and voiceWhite Zombie [trailer]: Victor Halperin (Director),  Edward Halperin (Producer), Halperin Productions, 1932 (full movie)
1923: Sérénade inutile, for voice and piano
1923: Si je pouvais mourir, for voice and piano
Recording session of five of Maurice Jacquet's mélodie and two aria's [Unknown singer, but most likely French baritone Joseph Saucier] in Montreal, Canada (1923).Les enfantsTes yeuxLes vieilles de chez nousXerxèsNovembrePatrie air de RysoorDamnation de Faust sérénadeExternal links
 
 
 Maurice Jacquet and his works on Art Lyrique.fr
Plan for music concert to aid first French Lycee in New York on Gettyimages.ch

 Further reading 

 “Léo Staats at the Roxy, 1926-1928.” (Dorris, 1995)
 "NEW ROXY THEATRE HAS GALA OPENING" (The New York Times, 1927)
"Hausarbeiten.de - Als das Grauen nach Hollywood kam" [When Horror came to Hollywood]. www.hausarbeiten.de'' (in German) - Kornberger, 2012

See also 

 List of French composers
 Music of France
 French classical music
 Lists of composers
 Conservatoire de Paris

References 

1886 births
1954 deaths
20th-century classical composers
French conductors (music)
French film score composers
French Romantic composers
People from Saint-Mandé

French operetta composers
French emigrants to the United States